Dame Marion Mildred Kettlewell,  (20 February 1914 – 11 April 2016) was a senior British naval officer who served as Director of the Women's Royal Naval Service from 1967 to 1970.

Kettlewell was born in Strawberry Hill, Twickenham, Richmond upon Thames, London on 20 February 1914. She joined the Women's Royal Naval Service in 1941, during the Second World War. She rose to the rank of commandant and was appointed Director of the Women's Royal Naval Service in 1967. Made a Dame Commander of the Order of the British Empire in the 1970 New Year Honours, Kettlewell retired later that year.

References

 
 
 

1914 births
2016 deaths
British centenarians
Dames Commander of the Order of the British Empire
Royal Navy officers of World War II
Women centenarians
British women in World War II
Women's Royal Naval Service officers